Lisa M. Frenkel is an American pediatrician currently Professor at University of Washington and an Elected Fellow of the American Association for the Advancement of Science.

Education
She earned her B.A. at University of Kansas from 1973–77 and her M.D. at University of Kansas Medical Center from 1977-81.

Research
Her research involves HIV transmission including from mother to child and also childhood infections and viruses. Her highest cited paper is Antiretroviral prophylaxis for HIV prevention in heterosexual men and women, at 1650 times, according to Google Scholar.

Publications
. 
.

References

1950s births
Living people
Fellows of the American Association for the Advancement of Science
University of Washington faculty
American pediatricians
Women pediatricians
University of Kansas alumni